Naskia is a genus of sea snails, marine gastropod mollusks in the family Horaiclavidae.

Species
Species within the genus Naskia include:
 Naskia axiplicata Sysoev & Ivanov, 1985

References

 Sysoev, A. V., and D. L. Ivanov. "Nex Taxa of the Family Turridae (Gastropoda, Toxoglossa) from the Naska-ridge (Southeast Pacific)." Zoologichesky Zhurnal 64.2 (1985): 194-205.

External links
  Tucker, J.K. 2004 Catalog of recent and fossil turrids (Mollusca: Gastropoda). Zootaxa 682:1-1295.

 
Horaiclavidae
Monotypic gastropod genera